Savall is a surname. Notable people with the surname include:

Jordi Savall (born 1941), Catalan conductor and viol player
Arianna Savall (born 1972), Catalan singer, harpist, and composer, daughter of Jordi

See also
Saval (surname)